On the Way  is the second Japanese studio album by Korean boy group The Boss, released on March 13, 2013 on the Japanese label Sony Music Entertainment.

Album information
The album was released in two different versions, including a regular edition and a limited edition. The limited edition comes with a special digipack with booklet, a CD including the same 12-song track list as the regular edition, as well as a DVD including the music video for the lead track and its offshoot. The regular edition comes with a CD and a trading card randomly selected from 6 types.

Track listing

CD

DVD

Charts

Release history

References

External links
 大国男児 | Sony Music 
 The Boss official website 

2013 albums
The Boss (band) albums